Senna Maatoug (born 19 August 1989) is a Dutch civil servant and politician, who has been a member of the House of Representatives since the 2021 general election. She is a member of the green political party GroenLinks.

Education and career 
She studied political science at Leiden University and economics at Utrecht University until 2013, when she obtained a master's and research master's degree. During her study, she also worked at the newspaper Leidsch Dagblad and reached the final of the 2013 World Universities Debating Championship in the category English as a Second Language.

Before becoming a member of parliament, Maatoug worked at the Social and Economic Council, at the Ministry of Social Affairs and Employment, and as an economist at the Ministry of Finance. Besides her job, she taught economics at Leiden University. Maautoug also served on the board of the Druckerfonds, a foundation that financially supports social and cultural initiatives in and around Leiden, between 2018 and 2021, and she is co-founder and co-chair of Het Collectief, a local organization organizing policy discussions.

She was placed fifth on the party list of GroenLinks in the 2021 general election. During the campaign, Maatoug argued that the number of temporary employment contracts had gotten out of control. She was elected to the House with 19,392 preference votes. Maatoug's specializations are social affairs, employment, pensions, integration, and child care, and she is on the parliamentary Committees for Finance, for Public Expenditure, and for Social Affairs and Employment as well as on the United States contact group and the Parliamentary Inquiry into Fraud Policy and Public Service, initiated as a result of the Dutch childcare benefits scandal. Together with Labour Party member of parliament Henk Nijboer, she wrote an alternative budget proposal with more spending on health care, education, and welfare, with higher corporate and capital taxes, and with a lower budget deficit compared to the coalition's budget. Furthermore, in reaction to widespread remote working during the COVID-19 pandemic to contain the virus, Maatoug and Steven van Weyenberg (D66) introduced a bill to prohibit companies from denying an employee's request to work from home or from the office without proper reasoning. The Wall Street Journal reported that it would make the Netherlands among the first countries with a right to work from home. The bill – called "Werken waar je wilt" (Working wherever you want) and an amendment to the Flexible Working Act of 2015 – was passed by the House in July 2022. Maatoug said that it would improve employee's work–life balance and that it would lead to lower commuting times.

Personal life 
Maatoug was born and raised in the South Holland city Leiden and still lives there. Her grandparents moved to the Netherlands from Morocco.

References

External links 
 Personal website 
 S. (Senna) Maatoug MPhil, MSc, Parlement.com 

1989 births
Living people
21st-century Dutch civil servants
21st-century Dutch economists
21st-century Dutch politicians
21st-century Dutch women politicians
Dutch people of Moroccan descent
Dutch women economists
GroenLinks politicians
Leiden University alumni
Academic staff of Leiden University
Members of the House of Representatives (Netherlands)
Utrecht University alumni